Welcome to the Universe: An Astrophysical Tour is a popular science book by Neil deGrasse Tyson, Michael A. Strauss, and J. Richard Gott, based on an introductory astrophysics course they co-taught at Princeton University.  The book was published by the Princeton University Press on September 20, 2016.

Reception
Welcome to the Universe: An Astrophysical Tour has been praised by literary critics.  Kirkus Reviews described the book as "an accessible and comprehensive overview of our universe by three eminent astrophysicists" and "an entertaining introduction to astronomy."  John Timpane of The Philadelphia Inquirer similarly called it "a well-illustrated tour that includes Pluto, questions of intelligent life, and whether the universe is infinite."  Publishers Weekly wrote:

References

Books by Neil deGrasse Tyson
Astronomy books
Cosmology books
2016 non-fiction books
Popular physics books
Princeton University Press books